The New South Wales Department of Education is a department of the Government of New South Wales. In addition to other responsibilities, it operates primary and secondary schools throughout the state.

G

H

I

J

K

L

M

N

O

P

See also
 List of government schools in New South Wales: A–F
 List of government schools in New South Wales: Q–Z

References

G G-P